Chile made its Paralympic Games début at the 1992 Summer Paralympics in Barcelona (following its return to democracy), sending a two-man delegation: a swimmer and a powerlifter. It has competed in every edition of the Summer Paralympics since then. Chile first competed in the Winter Paralympics in 2002, and has also taken part in every subsequent edition of the Winter Games. Chilean delegations to the Winter Games have been small, always consisting in just two athletes. At the 2012 Summer Paralympics, Chile won its first ever Paralympic medal when Cristian Valenzuela received a gold medal in the men's 5000 metres event for T11 competitors.
At the 2020 Summer Paralympics, swimmer Alberto Abarza claimed the gold medal in the Men's 100 meter backstroke S2.

Medalists

See also
 Chile at the Olympics

References